Cyriopagopus paganus is a tarantula which was first described by Eugène Simon in 1887. They can be found in Thailand  Vietnam, and Myanmar. They are burrowers, being found in this area, inside their burrows, waiting for prey.

Description 
They own a grayish-black carapace, with grayish-black legs, except for the femur, which is a deep black. The opisthosoma is also a grayish-black color, with a deep black fishbone pattern. It looks somewhat similar to the Cyriopagopus vonwirthi tarantula, except Cyriopagopus paganus is darker, and lacks some of the skeletal coloration. Though Cyriopagopus vonwirthi coloration is also dependent on the locality it was found in, some times either of this species are mislabeled for one another.

Habitat 
They are found in the rainforests of Thailand, Vietnam, and Myanmar, originally being found in Dawei, as such I will be referring to the last for this section. It is found in areas with a tropical monsoon climate, where temperature averages 27ºC, and average yearly rainfall is 1400mm. The area is home to plants such as Habropetalum dawei, and the Lotus Flower.

Behavior 
They are burrowers, making web lined burrow, but they will also make use of any readily available hide. They are quite defensive tarantulas, if unable to flee, they will sprint towards you, and attempt to bite. They are old world species, meaning they probably own a medically significant venom.

References 

Spiders described in 1887
Spiders of Asia
Theraphosidae